María de los Ángeles Nieto Iglesias (stage name, Ángeles Ottein; Algete, 24 June 1895 – Madrid, 12 March 1981) was a Spanish soprano, opera and zarzuela singer. She was the daughter of José Nieto Méndez, a notary of Burgos, and Erundina. Her siblings included Ofelia Nieto and José Nieto, who were also opera and zarzuela singers. Ottein debuted in 1914 with a performance in ''Marina'', performing in opera and zarzuela for the next 40 years.

References

Bibliography
 Girbal Hernández, F. Cien cantantes españoles de ópera y zarzuela. Ed. Lira 1994 (in Spanish)

 Matas, Ricart. Diccionario Biográfico de la Música. Ed. Iberia 1956 (in Spanish)* Sagarmínaga, Joaquín. Diccionario de Cantantes Líricos Españoles. Ed. Acento 1997 (in Spanish)
 VV. AA. Diccionario de la Música Española e Hispanoamericana. Ed. SGAE 1999 (in Spanish)

External links
 Àngeles Ottein performs La Cancíon del Olvido (Jose Serrano) with Marcos Redondo and orchestra on archive.org

1981 deaths
Voice teachers
1895 births
Spanish sopranos
People from Madrid
Singers from the Community of Madrid
20th-century Spanish women opera singers
Women music educators